The Town of Rome is located in Adams County in the U.S. state of Wisconsin. The population was 2,720 at the 2010 census. The census-designated places of Lake Arrowhead, Lake Camelot, and Lake Sherwood are located in the town. The unincorporated communities of New Rome and Rome are also located in the town.

Geography

The Town of Rome is located in the northwestern corner of Adams County.  Petenwell Lake, an impoundment of the Wisconsin River, covers the western border of the town. Lake Arrowhead, Lake Sherwood, and Camelot Lake are impoundments on Fourteenmile Creek, a tributary of the Wisconsin River, and are surrounded by census-designated places named after the lakes.

Demographics
As of the census of 2000, there were 2,656 people, 1,181 households, and 884 families residing in the town. The population density was 49.0 people per square mile (18.9/km2). There were 2,354 housing units at an average density of 43.4 per square mile (16.8/km2). The racial makeup of the town was 98.42% White, 0.26% Native American, 0.45% Asian, 0.04% from other races, and 0.83% from two or more races. Hispanic or Latino of any race were 0.26% of the population.

There were 1,181 households, out of which 19.8% had children under the age of 18 living with them, 68.8% were married couples living together, 4.2% had a female householder with no husband present, and 25.1% were non-families. 20.9% of all households were made up of individuals, and 8.7% had someone living alone who was 65 years of age or older. The average household size was 2.25 and the average family size was 2.57.

In the town, the population was spread out, with 17.2% under the age of 18, 3.9% from 18 to 24, 20.4% from 25 to 44, 34.3% from 45 to 64, and 24.1% who were 65 years of age or older. The median age was 51 years. For every 100 females, there were 103.4 males. For every 100 females age 18 and over, there were 105.0 males.

The median income for a household in the town was $44,000, and the median income for a family was $46,579. Males had a median income of $40,682 versus $22,083 for females. The per capita income for the town was $23,901. About 3.0% of families and 3.7% of the population were below the poverty line, including 2.4% of those under age 18 and 4.0% of those age 65 or over.

Further reading
A sesquicentennial history of the town, Mark Scarborough's There's No Place Like Rome: Celebrating the Journey, 1857 to 2007, was published by Barking Dog Press in time to be released at the Taste of Rome event in July 2007. A hardcover 268-page book with 170 photos and featuring 30 interviews with town elders, There's No Place Like Rome chronicles the history of Rome from its hardscrabble agricultural start to its transformation as a recreational Mecca. Scarborough is a former historian of the Wisconsin Rapids Daily Tribune, where he worked from 1986 to 2003.

References

Towns in Adams County, Wisconsin
Populated places established in 1857
Towns in Wisconsin
1857 establishments in Wisconsin